The 1981 Air Force Falcons football team represented the United States Air Force Academy in the 1981 NCAA Division I-A football season. The team was led by third-year head coach Ken Hatfield and played its home games at Falcon Stadium. It finished the regular season with a 4–7 overall record and a 2–3 record in Western Athletic Conference games.

Schedule

Personnel

References

Air Force
Air Force Falcons football seasons
Air Force Falcons football